The local elections of Valencia City was held on May 13, 2013 in conjunction with the Philippine general election. The voters elected several local posts in the city: the mayor, vice mayor, and ten members of the sangguniang panlungsod. Each official is elected publicly to a 3-year term and can be re-elected up to 3 terms in succession.

In 2013, the city has 120,411 registered voters with a 24.25% increase from the 2010 statistics of 96,913 registered voters. Since Valencia City is a component city and is still in the jurisdiction of the Province of Bukidnon, its registered voters still need to vote for the provincial posts: the governor, vice-governor, one congressman, and two members of the sangguniang panlalawigan. Also in this elections, since Valencia is redistricted from the third to the newly created fourth legislative district of Bukidnon, its registered voters will now have to vote for a district representative coming from the latter instead of the former.

Candidates
Mayor Leandro Jose H. Catarata was the incumbent on his second term and ran for a third term under the banner of Bukidnon Paglaum Party of the Zubiris who had forged an alliance with the Liberal Party. Jose M. Galario, who had been the mayor of the city from 2001 until 2007, and who also ran and lost on the same post in the 2010 local elections, ran for the fourth time. For the first time, incumbent Sangguniang Panlungsod members Arlyn P. Ayon of the Partido Demokratiko Pilipino-Lakas ng Bayan, and Cleofe A. Mabao of the Nacionalista Party, also ran for the vetted post.

Incumbent Vice-Mayor Azucena P. Huervas ran for the vied for the post as the running mate of Catarata. Huervas was previously the President of Valencia's Association of Barangay Captains, but was assigned to replace the post vacated by Vice-Mayor Benjamin Verano, Sr. who died in office. Incumbent Sangguniang Panlungsod members Rhea Rhenna H. Agripo, and Almer M. Alfonso, Sr. of Partido Demokratiko Pilipino-Lakas ng Bayan challenged Huervas for the said post.

Incumbent Sangguniang Panlungsod members Francisco L. Alkuino, Glen G. Galario, Rolando P. Laviña, and Camilo E. Pepito were all seeking for reelection. Twenty-four others, who are running under a political party such as Partido Demokratiko Pilipino-Lakas ng Bayan and Nacionalista Party, or as an independent candidate, also ran for the vetted 10 seats in the city legislative council. Some ran again for a post after they had failed to win a seat during the 2010 local elections.

Results

Mayor

Vice-Mayor

Sangguniang Panlungsod
NOTE: Results for the 2010 local elections are found at COMELEC's official website.

^  Vicente C. Desebayla took over Azucena P. Huervas' position after Huervas was assigned to take over Verano's vice-mayoralty post after his death. Desabalya ran for the 2013 elections for the Sangguniang Lungsod, but failed to win a seat. However, he will still be the ABC President until the Barangay and Sangguniang Kabataan elections on October 28, 2013.
^  Czarina Eloise C. Berou will still serve as the SK President until the Barangay and Sangguniang Kabataan elections on October 28, 2013.

Per candidate

References

External links
COMELEC - Official website of the Philippine Commission on Elections (COMELEC)
NAMFREL - Official website of National Movement for Free Elections (NAMFREL)
PPCRV - Official website of the Parish Pastoral Council for Responsible Voting (PPCRV)

Elections in Bukidnon
2013 Philippine local elections